YMB Saya Tin (11 February 1894 – 8 August 1950) was a Burmese composer. He was one of three well known pre-war composers with the name Saya Tin. He is best known for composing "Kaba Ma Kyei", the national anthem of Myanmar.

Early life
Tin was born in Mandalay on 11 February 1894 (7th waxing of Tabodwe 1255 ME) to Daw Thein and her husband U Yan Aung, a former official in the service of the last Burmese king Thibaw. He had one elder sister and one younger sister.

After finishing high school at age 17, Tin worked as a school teacher in a private school for the next three years. In his leisure time Tin took up playing his concertina, exploring its sounds, and studying traditional Burmese music.

Musical career
In 1918, Tin founded his own private school, the "Young Men's Buddhist School" in Mandalay, and came to be known as YMB Saya Tin. (Saya in Burmese means "teacher"). His school's musical troupe performed free of charge at charity events and weddings.

In 1930, Tin closed down his school and moved to Yangon where his songs had been recorded, and used in films. Tin met up with an old classmate Thakin Ba Thaung, and joined his political movement, Dobama Asiayone (We Burmese Association).

"Kaba Ma Kyei"
Tin composed Do Bama Song (တို့ဗမာသီချင်း), in 1930, with Ba Thaung supplying the patriotic lyrics. Tin himself gave the first ceremonial rendition of the song on the flat ground of Shwedagon Pagoda at 5:00 pm on 20 July 1930. After the ceremony, Tin was imprisoned by British officers, who accused him of inciting insurgents. He was later released in 1946. In 1942, Do Bama Song was adopted as the national anthem of the State of Burma. In 1947, it was used as a template for the National Anthem of the Union of Burma, for which Tin was awarded Rs.1,000/-. The Burmese government awarded him the title Wunna Kyawhtin (the beautiful-famous) on the Independence Day, 4 January 1950.

Death
Tin died of tuberculosis on 8 August 1950 and was buried in Yangon. Tin had composed over 4,000 songs.

References
Notes

Sources
 

1894 births
1950 deaths
20th-century deaths from tuberculosis
Burmese musicians
National anthem writers
Tuberculosis deaths in Myanmar
Burmese people of World War II
People from Mandalay
Recipients of the Wunna Kyawhtin